Basketball at the 1991 Games of the Small States of Europe was played in Andorra la Vella, between 21 and 25 May 1991.

Medal summary

Men's tournament

Group A or B

Group A or B

Fifth position game

Final bracket

Women's tournament

External links
Results at the Cypriot Basketball Federation
Malta basketball team at the GSSE
Times of Malta Archive

1991 in basketball
1991 Games of the Small States of Europe
Basketball at the Games of the Small States of Europe
Basketball in Andorra